Perry Botkin (July 22, 1907October 14, 1973) was an American jazz guitarist, banjoist, and composer.

Career 
Born in Springfield, Ohio, Perry Botkin started working in the 1920s for Wayne Euchner, who had a big band in West Baden, Indiana. Around 1928 he worked with Phil Napoleon's Original Memphis Five. Later he played the guitar on Hoagy Carmichael's Hong Kong Blues.  He also recorded with Al Jolson, Buddy Cole Trio, Connee Boswell, Eddie Cantor, Glenn Miller, Benny Goodman, Paul Whiteman, Bob Hope, Fred Astaire, Spike Jones, Roy Rogers, and The Dorsey Brothers.

For 17 years he worked as musical director for Bing Crosby. He appeared as a musician in The Adventures of Ozzie and Harriet (1956-1957). In 1958 he composed the score for Murder by Contract, and in the 1960s he composed many songs for The Beverly Hillbillies, e.g. "Elly May's Theme". His son, Perry Botkin Jr., was also a musician and composer.

Perry Botkin died in Van Nuys, California at the age of 66.

Discography 
 The World Is Waiting for the Sunrise (Decca, 1951)

References

External links 
 
 
 
 Perry Botkin recordings at the Discography of American Historical Recordings.

1907 births
1973 deaths
American jazz composers
American male jazz composers
American film score composers
American male film score composers
American male songwriters
American jazz guitarists
20th-century classical musicians
20th-century American guitarists
20th-century American composers
American male guitarists
20th-century American male musicians
20th-century jazz composers
People from Springfield, Ohio